The Spilka (Ukrainian Social-Democratic Union) arose late in 1904 having broken away from the Revolutionary Ukrainian Party. It entered the Russian Social Democratic Labour Party as an autonomous regional organisation. In the inner-Party struggle of the R.S.D.L.P. it sided with the Mensheviks. It broke up in the period of reaction. In 1912 there were only small disconnected groups of the Spilka and by then most of its members had turned nationalists. Trotsky's Pravda (Vienna) was published as an organ of the Spilka in October and December 1908 (the first two issues).

References

Defunct socialist parties in Ukraine
Russian Social Democratic Labour Party